The 2021 Major League Baseball All-Star Game was the 91st Major League Baseball All-Star Game. The game was hosted by the Colorado Rockies and played at Coors Field on July 13, with the American League (AL) defeating the National League (NL) 5–2. It was the eighth consecutive All-Star Game victory for the AL.

The game was originally to be hosted in Atlanta at Truist Park. However, following the Georgia State Legislature's passage of the Election Integrity Act of 2021, the game was moved to Coors Field in Denver. The All-Star Game was the second to be played in Denver after the 1998 game.

Kevin Cash of the Tampa Bay Rays managed the AL and Dave Roberts of the defending World Series champion Los Angeles Dodgers managed the NL. For the first time in All-Star Game history, Los Angeles Angels player Shohei Ohtani served as the starting pitcher and lead-off batter. The matchup also featured the 200th home run of the All-Star Game, which was hit by Toronto Blue Jays player Vladimir Guerrero Jr.

Background

Host selection

Original selection of Atlanta 
Atlanta was originally awarded the game on May 30, 2019; it was to be the first All-Star Game hosted by Truist Park and the third All-Star Game played in Atlanta after the 1972 and 2000 editions.

Georgia voting law and relocation to Denver 

In March 2021, there were calls for the All-Star Game to be moved from Atlanta, in protest of the Georgia State Legislature's passage of the Election Integrity Act of 2021. The bill contains various provisions that impact how elections are conducted in the state; some of these provisions have been considered by many on the political left to have a disproportionate impact on certain communities, such as African Americans and Hispanic Americans, MLBPA executive director Tony Clark stated that he was "very much aware" of the issue, and that he was willing to discuss the matter with Commissioner of Baseball Rob Manfred. A sizeable portion of the player base and fan base are Hispanic and that has factored into the relocation threat. 

In an interview with ESPN's Sage Steele on March 31, President Joe Biden stated that he would "strongly support" moving the game out of Georgia, saying that Republican efforts to make voting laws more restrictive following the 2020 presidential election was "Jim Crow on steroids". On April 1, Manfred stated that he was "talking to various constituencies within the game and I'm just not going beyond that in terms of what I would consider or not consider." In an April 1 interview with Fox News, Georgia Governor Brian Kemp criticized the efforts, calling them "ridiculous".

On April 2, MLB announced that the game and the 2021 MLB Draft (which was added to the All-Star festivities this year) would be moved from Georgia, and that the game would be relocated to a different city in another state, to be determined. Commissioner Manfred stated that "Major League Baseball fundamentally supports voting rights for all Americans and opposes restrictions to the ballot box." Governor Kemp later responded by saying that he would not back down over his decision, claiming that MLB caved to "fear, political opportunism, and liberal lies." Kemp also claimed that the move was an example of cancel culture. In a statement shared on Twitter, former President Donald Trump also criticized the decision, calling for a boycott of MLB. Texas Governor Greg Abbott cancelled a planned appearance at the Texas Rangers' home opener, where he had been scheduled to throw out the first pitch, in protest of the decision to move the game. In a letter to the Rangers stating his decision, Abbott also wrote that he would not participate in any future events organized by MLB and that Texas would not bid to host future All-Star games or other MLB special events. On Twitter, former Georgia gubernatorial candidate Stacey Abrams at first called for the change; however, she later recognized the decision was not received well by Georgia citizens and eventually stated her disappointment over the decision, saying, "I don't want to see Georgia families hurt by lost events and jobs," while also stating that she understood why it was made. In a tweet, former President Barack Obama also praised MLB for moving the game out of Georgia.

On April 14, five Republican senators and representatives introduced legislation to strip Major League Baseball of its antitrust exemption in response to the move.

An April 5 Morning Consult poll found that 39% of U.S. adults approved of the move while 28% percent of U.S. adults disapproved, and 32% of U.S. adults stated they had no opinion or didn't know about the move. Overall support for the move was higher among MLB fans, Democrats, and people of color compared to the general population. Data from Morning Consult Brand Intelligence also showed that Republican approval of the MLB dropped by 35 percentage points from 47 points to 12 points.

The 2021 MLB All-Star Game became at least the third major sporting event in the United States to be relocated for political reasons. Prior relocations that were announced in protest of states' political decisions include the 2017 NBA All-Star Game, which the NBA relocated in 2016 from Charlotte, North Carolina, in response to the passage of Public Facilities Privacy & Security Act which critics found transphobic, and Super Bowl XXVII, which the NFL relocated in 1990 from Tempe, Arizona, in response to a failed state referendum to recognize Martin Luther King Jr. Day.

On April 5, MLB announced that Coors Field in Denver would host the All-Star Game.

Logo and jerseys 

On April 23, the All-Star Game logo was unveiled, featuring the Rockies' colors of purple, white, black, and silver with a profile representing the Rocky Mountains at the bottom. On June 24, MLB announced that players would wear standardized jerseys during the All-Star Game, rather than their own team's jerseys—navy blue for American League players and white for National League players.

Roster selections 
Voting for All-Star Game starting players was conducted in two phases: the first phase determined three finalists for each defensive position in each league (with nine finalists for the three outfield positions in each league) plus a designated hitter for the American League, and the second phase determined the starting players. Voting for each phase was independent; that is, votes did not carry over between phases. First phase voting was held from June 3 through June 24, and second phase voting was June 28 through July 1. All voting was conducted online, at MLB.com (or associated mobile applications) or via Google Search. Starting players, as selected via voting, were announced on July 1. Reserve position players and all pitchers—selected through "a combination of Player Ballot selections and choices made by the Commissioner’s Office"—were announced on July 4.

MLB requires that at least one player from each major-league team be selected to the game. However, there is no requirement for each team to have a player rostered for the game—for various reasons, each of the four players from the Houston Astros selected to the game became unavailable, leaving the Astros, who was at the center of a major cheating scandal, without a player on the American League's active roster for the game.

The total of 40 players named All-Stars for the first time set a new MLB record.

Rosters

American League

National League

Roster notes

<ol type="a">
Taijuan Walker was named as the roster replacement for Jacob deGrom due to deGrom opting not to play.
Freddy Peralta was named as the roster replacement for Brandon Woodruff due to Woodruff starting on Sunday.
Tim Anderson was named as the roster replacement for Carlos Correa due to Correa opting not to play.
Chris Bassitt was named as the roster replacement for Ryan Pressly due to Pressly opting not to play.
Whit Merrifield was named as the roster replacement for José Altuve due to injury.
Joey Wendle was named as the roster replacement for Michael Brantley due to injury.
Walker Buehler was named as the roster replacement for Yu Darvish due to injury. 
Justin Turner was named as the roster replacement for Mookie Betts due to injury. 
Max Scherzer was named as the roster replacement for Kevin Gausman due to Gausman starting on Sunday. 
Yadier Molina was named as the roster replacement for Buster Posey due to injury.  
Omar Narváez was named as the roster replacement for Yadier Molina due to injury. 
Manny Machado was named as the roster replacement for Ronald Acuña Jr. due to injury.
Cedric Mullins was named starter in place of Mike Trout due to injury.
Bryan Reynolds was named starter in place of Ronald Acuña Jr. due to injury. 
J. T. Realmuto was named starter in place of Buster Posey due to injury.
Andrew Kittredge was named as the roster replacement for Gerrit Cole due to Cole throwing 129 pitches on Saturday.
Taylor Rogers was named as the roster replacement for Yusei Kikuchi due to injury.
#: Indicates player would not play (replaced as per reference notes above).

Game summary
MLB allowed the American League to roster Shohei Ohtani as both the team's starting pitcher and starting designated hitter (DH), allowing Ohtani (and his replacement) to continue as DH even after he was removed from the game as a pitcher.

Starting lineup

Line score

See also
 List of Major League Baseball All-Star Games
 Major League Baseball All-Star Game Most Valuable Player Award
 All-Star Futures Game
 Home Run Derby

References

External links

Major League Baseball All-Star Game
All-Star
Major League Baseball All Star Game
Major League Baseball All-Star Game
Baseball competitions in Denver
2020s in Denver